Moudachirou Amadou (born 11 December 1971) is a Beninese former professional footballer who played as a defender.

Playing career
Amadou spent one season in the Bundesliga with FC St. Pauli.

Coaching career
From signing in summer 2008 with TSV Bernhausen Amadou worked as teamchef, formerly coaching the Bambinis of TuS Holstein Quickborn.

Personal life
Amadou is in partnership with the German Daniela Zollweg from Cottbus and holds a German passport.

References

External links

1971 births
Living people
People from Cotonou
Beninese footballers
Association football defenders
Benin international footballers
FC Erzgebirge Aue players
FC Energie Cottbus players
Karlsruher SC players
Hannover 96 players
FC St. Pauli players
Bundesliga players
2. Bundesliga players
Beninese expatriate footballers
Beninese expatriate sportspeople in Belgium
Expatriate footballers  in Belgium
Beninese expatriate sportspeople in Germany
Expatriate footballers  in Germany